Thomas B. Ricketts (15 January 1853 – 19 January 1939) was an English-born American stage and film actor and director who was a pioneer in the film industry. He portrayed Ebenezer Scrooge in the first American film adaptation of A Christmas Carol (1908), and directed one of the first motion pictures ever made in Hollywood. After directing scores of silent films, including the first film to be released by Universal Pictures, Ricketts became a prominent character actor.

Biography
Thomas B. Ricketts was born in Greenwich, London 15 January 1853, the son of Rosa (née Penniall) Robert Ricketts. His father was a painter and when Thomas was 17 years old he emigrated to the United States, and initially worked as a painter himself. However he soon moved into acting in the theatre and directed plays on Broadway for Charles Frohman. He was a stage manager for the Shubert family, sang baritone with the Carleton Opera Company, and starred in his own play, Henri Duvar.

In 1906, after he had been with the Shuberts for four years, Ricketts was persuaded by a friend to join Essanay Studios in Chicago. He played Scrooge in A Christmas Carol (1908), the first American film adaption of the Dickens classic, then starred in The Old Curiosity Shop (1909). When Ricketts said he had toured with a comedy he had written, A Cure for Gout, the company asked him to make a 600-foot film of it—the length limit for a comedy at that time.

Ricketts became a director, taking over comedies and melodramas from Broncho Billy Anderson, who in turn took over Westerns. Ethel Clayton, Jack Conway, J. Warren Kerrigan and Bryant Washburn were among Ricketts's discoveries—along with Josephine Ditt, "the best-dressed woman on the screen", to whom Ricketts was married. Chief dramatic and general producer for two years at Essanay, he helped organize the American Film Manufacturing Company in 1910. He made six films for the Flying "A" before withdrawing and seeking another opportunity.

In 1911 Ricketts moved to California, together with Canadian film pioneer Al Christie, with thoughts of creating a new film company. "We arrived in Los Angeles with no idea of where to establish our studio," Ricketts remembered. "A real estate man who happened to overhear our discussion of a studio site suggested Hollywood. The next day we found our way out to Sunset and Gower, to a defunct roadhouse. The owner, a woman, wanted $60 a month rent for the entire block. We thought it was too much, but we signed a lease." The Nestor Film Company opened its studio October 27, 1911.

Ricketts directed one of the first Hollywood-made motion pictures, The Best Man Wins (1911), photographed by Charles Rosher. Its stars were juvenile leading man Harold Lockwood, ingenue Dorothy Davenport, vamp Josephine Ditt, juvenile ingenue Victoria Forde, male heavy Gordon Sackville, and character actresses Eugenie Forde and Alice Davenport. Allan Dwan was Ricketts's assistant.

Nestor made between 50 and 60 films—half of them directed by Ricketts—over the next 18 months. On May 20, 1912, the company merged with the Universal Film Manufacturing Company, Nestor's distributor beginning with The Dawn of Netta (1912), directed by Ricketts.

In 1914, on an independent contract, Ricketts directed Richard Bennett in Damaged Goods back at American. When flower girls were needed for a wedding scene, Bennett's three daughters—Joan Bennett, Constance Bennett and Barbara Bennett—began their film careers. "Its success made me a little egotistical," Ricketts recalled. "It cost about $25,000 to make and brought in a million and a half on its first run. I naturally thought it would put me in great demand as a director. But it didn't. I had to start all over again, this time going back to my old trade as an actor." However, Ricketts did direct several more feature films for American through 1916, including some with their major romantic team of May Allison and Harold Lockwood such as The Lure of the Mask (1915) and The Other Side of the Door (1916).

Returning to acting in 1919, in his mid-60s, Ricketts was almost always in demand for character parts. By 1935 he was described as "white-haired and bent with age … content with an occasional film role". His later films included Top Hat (1935), After the Thin Man (1936), Pennies from Heaven (1936), The Young in Heart (1938) and Son of Frankenstein (1939). He was regarded as the oldest working actor in Hollywood.

Ricketts died at Hollywood Hospital 19 January 1939, aged 86, of pneumonia, contracted the previous week when he went to work at Universal Studios despite a cold. "Mr. Ricketts left no funds," reported The New York Times, "and expenses of his funeral will be paid by the Motion Picture Relief Society." Josephine Ricketts, hospitalized in Santa Monica since suffering a stroke at Christmas, was not informed of her husband's death; it was reported that she would be told sometime before his funeral. Ricketts was buried in an unmarked grave at Hollywood Forever Cemetery.

Select filmography

Director

Actor

Notes

References

External links

 
 

American film directors
Male actors from London
American male silent film actors
Silent film directors
1853 births
1939 deaths
20th-century American male actors
Deaths from pneumonia in California
British emigrants to the United States